TypeScript is a free and open source high-level programming language developed and maintained by Microsoft. It is a strict syntactical superset of JavaScript and adds optional static typing to the language. It is designed for the development of large applications and transpiles to JavaScript. As it is a superset of JavaScript, existing JavaScript programs are also valid TypeScript programs.

TypeScript may be used to develop JavaScript applications for both client-side and server-side execution (as with Node.js or Deno). Multiple options are available for transpilation. The default TypeScript Compiler can be used, or the Babel compiler can be invoked to convert TypeScript to JavaScript.

TypeScript supports definition files that can contain type information of existing JavaScript libraries, much like C++ header files can describe the structure of existing object files. This enables other programs to use the values defined in the files as if they were statically typed TypeScript entities. There are third-party header files for popular libraries such as jQuery, MongoDB, and D3.js. TypeScript headers for the Node.js library modules are also available, allowing development of Node.js programs within TypeScript.

The TypeScript compiler is itself written in TypeScript and compiled to JavaScript. It is licensed under the Apache License 2.0. Anders Hejlsberg, lead architect of C# and creator of Delphi and Turbo Pascal, has worked on the development of TypeScript.

History 
TypeScript was released to the public in October 2012, with version 0.8, after two years of internal development at Microsoft. Soon after the initial public release, Miguel de Icaza praised the language itself, but criticized the lack of mature IDE support apart from Microsoft Visual Studio, which was not available on Linux and OS X at that time. As of April 2021 there is support in other IDEs and text editors, including Emacs, Vim, WebStorm, Atom and Microsoft's own Visual Studio Code.TypeScript 0.9, released in 2013, added support for generics. 

TypeScript 1.0 was released at Microsoft's Build developer conference in 2014. Visual Studio 2013 Update 2 provides built-in support for TypeScript. Further improvement were made in July 2014, when the development team announced a new TypeScript compiler, asserted to have a five-fold performance increase. Simultaneously, the source code, which was initially hosted on CodePlex, was moved to GitHub.

On 22 September 2016, TypeScript 2.0 was released, introducing several features, including the ability for programmers to optionally enforce null safety, sometimes referred to as the billion-dollar mistake.

TypeScript 3.0 was released on 30 July 2018, bringing many language additions like tuples in rest parameters and spread expressions, rest parameters with tuple types, generic rest parameters and so on.

TypeScript 4.0 was released on 20 August 2020. While 4.0 did not introduce any breaking changes, it added language features such as Custom JSX Factories and Variadic Tuple Types.

TypeScript 5.0 was released on 16 March 2023.

Design 
TypeScript originated from the shortcomings of JavaScript for the development of large-scale applications both at Microsoft and among their external customers. Challenges with dealing with complex JavaScript code led to demand for custom tooling to ease developing of components in the language.

TypeScript developers sought a solution that would not break compatibility with the standard and its cross-platform support. Knowing that the current ECMAScript standard proposal promised future support for class-based programming, TypeScript was based on that proposal. That led to a JavaScript compiler with a set of syntactical language extensions, a superset based on the proposal, that transforms the extensions into regular JavaScript. In this sense the class feature of TypeScript was a preview of what to expect of ECMAScript 2015. A unique aspect not in the proposal, but added to TypeScript, is optional static typing (also known as gradual typing) that enables static language analysis to facilitate tooling and IDE support.

ECMAScript 2015 support 

TypeScript adds support for features such as classes, modules, and an arrow function syntax as defined in the ECMAScript 2015 standard.

Features 
TypeScript is a language extension that adds features to ECMAScript 6. Additional features include:
 Type annotations and compile-time type checking
 Type inference
 Type erasure
 Interfaces
 Enumerated types
 Generics
 Namespaces
 Tuples
 Async/await

The following features are backported from ECMAScript 2015:
 Classes
 Modules
 Abbreviated "arrow" syntax for anonymous functions
 Optional parameters and default parameters

Syntactically, TypeScript is very similar to JScript .NET, another Microsoft implementation of the ECMA-262 language standard that added support for static typing and classical object-oriented language features such as classes, inheritance, interfaces, and namespaces.

Compatibility with JavaScript 
TypeScript is a strict superset of ECMAScript 2015, which is itself a superset of ECMAScript 5, commonly referred to as JavaScript. As such, a JavaScript program is also a valid TypeScript program, and a TypeScript program can seamlessly consume JavaScript. By default the compiler targets ECMAScript 5, the current prevailing standard, but is also able to generate constructs used in ECMAScript 3 or 2015.

With TypeScript, it is possible to use existing JavaScript code, incorporate popular JavaScript libraries, and call TypeScript-generated code from other JavaScript. Type declarations for these libraries are provided with the source code.

Type annotations 
TypeScript provides static typing through type annotations to enable type checking at compile time. This is optional and can be ignored to use the regular dynamic typing of JavaScript.
function add(left: number, right: number): number {
	return left + right;
}

The annotations for the primitive types are number, boolean and string. 
Typescript also supports data types with following annotations Array, Enums, void.

Additional data types are: Tuple, Union, never and any.
An array with predefined data types at each index is Tuple type.
A variable that holds more than one type of data is Union type.
When you are sure that something is never going to occur you use never type.
Weakly- or dynamically-typed structures are of any type.

Type annotations can be exported to a separate declarations file to make type information available for TypeScript scripts using types already compiled into JavaScript. Annotations can be declared for an existing JavaScript library, as has been done for Node.js and jQuery.

The TypeScript compiler makes use of type inference to infer types when types are not given. For example, the add method in the code above would be inferred as returning a number even if no return type annotation had been provided. This is based on the static types of left and right being numbers, and the compiler's knowledge that the result of adding two numbers is always a number. However, explicitly declaring the return type allows the compiler to verify correctness.

If no type can be inferred because of lack of declarations, then it defaults to the dynamic any type. A value of the any type supports the same operations as a value in JavaScript and minimal static type checking is performed for operations on any values.

Declaration files 
When a TypeScript script gets compiled there is an option to generate a declaration file (with the extension .d.ts) that functions as an interface to the components in the compiled JavaScript. In the process the compiler strips away all function and method bodies and preserves only the signatures of the types that are exported. The resulting declaration file can then be used to describe the exported virtual TypeScript types of a JavaScript library or module when a third-party developer consumes it from TypeScript.

The concept of declaration files is analogous to the concept of header file found in C/C++.
declare namespace arithmetics {
    add(left: number, right: number): number;
    subtract(left: number, right: number): number;
    multiply(left: number, right: number): number;
    divide(left: number, right: number): number;
}

Type declaration files can be written by hand for existing JavaScript libraries, as has been done for jQuery and Node.js.

Large collections of declaration files for popular JavaScript libraries are hosted on GitHub in DefinitelyTyped.

Classes 
TypeScript supports ECMAScript 2015 classes that integrate the optional type annotations support.
class Person {
    private name: string;
    private age: number;
    private salary: number;

    constructor(name: string, age: number, salary: number) {
        this.name = name;
        this.age = age;
        this.salary = salary;
    }

    toString(): string {
        return `${this.name} (${this.age}) (${this.salary})`; // As of version 1.4
    }
}

Generics 
TypeScript supports generic programming. The following is an example of the identity function.

function id<T>(x: T): T {
    return x;
}

Union types

Modules and namespaces 
TypeScript distinguishes between modules and namespaces. Both features in TypeScript support encapsulation of classes, interfaces, functions and variables into containers. Namespaces (formerly internal modules) utilize immediately-invoked function expression of JavaScript to encapsulate code, whereas modules (formerly external modules) leverage JavaScript library patterns to do so (AMD or CommonJS).

Development tools

Compiler 
The TypeScript compiler, named tsc, is written in TypeScript. As a result, it can be compiled into regular JavaScript and can then be executed in any JavaScript engine (e.g. a browser). The compiler package comes bundled with a script host that can execute the compiler. It is also available as a Node.js package that uses Node.js as a host.

The current version of the compiler supports ECMAScript 5 by default. An option is allowed to target ECMAScript 2015 to make use of language features exclusive to that version (e.g. generators). Classes, despite being part of the ECMAScript 2015 standard, are available in both modes.

IDE and editor support 
 Microsoft provides a plug-in for Visual Studio 2012 and WebMatrix, full integrated support in Visual Studio 2013, Visual Studio 2015, and basic text editor support for Emacs and Vim.
 Visual Studio Code is a (mostly) open-source, cross-platform source code editor developed by Microsoft based on Electron. It supports TypeScript in addition to several other languages, and offers features like debugging and intelligent code completion.
 alm.tools is an open source cloud IDE for TypeScript built using TypeScript, ReactJS and TypeStyle.
 JetBrains supports TypeScript with code completion, refactoring and debugging in its IDEs built on IntelliJ platform, such as PhpStorm 6, WebStorm 6, and IntelliJ IDEA, as well as their Visual Studio Add-in and extension, ReSharper 8.1.
 Atom has a TypeScript plugin with support for code completion, navigation, formatting, and fast compilation.
 The online Cloud9 IDE and Codenvy support TypeScript.
 A plugin is available for the NetBeans IDE.
 A plugin is available for the Eclipse IDE (version Kepler)
 TypEcs is available for the Eclipse IDE.
 The Cross Platform Cloud IDE Codeanywhere supports TypeScript.
 Webclipse An Eclipse plugin designed to develop TypeScript and Angular 2.
 Angular IDE A standalone IDE available via npm to develop TypeScript and Angular 2 applications, with integrated terminal support.
 Tide TypeScript Interactive Development Environment for Emacs.

Integration with build automation tools 
Using plug-ins, TypeScript can be integrated with build automation tools, including Grunt (grunt-ts), Apache Maven (TypeScript Maven Plugin), Gulp (gulp-typescript) and Gradle (TypeScript Gradle Plugin).

Linting tools 
TSLint scans TypeScript code for conformance to a set of standards and guidelines. ESLint, a standard JavaScript linter, also provided some support for TypeScript via community plugins. However, ESLint's inability to leverage TypeScript's language services precluded certain forms of semantic linting and program-wide analysis. In early 2019, the TSLint team announced the linter's deprecation in favor of typescript-eslint, a joint effort of the TSLint, ESLint and TypeScript teams to consolidate linting under the ESLint umbrella for improved performance, community unity and developer accessibility.

Release history

See also 

 Dart
 Kotlin
 JS++
 PureScript

References

Citations

Sources 

 "Webclipse : Eclipse Plugin" Genuitec. Retrieved 9 November 2016.
 "Angular IDE by Webclipse : Standalone IDE" Genuitec. Retrieved 9 November 2016.

External links 
 TypeScript project at GitHub
 TypeScript Language Specification
 CATS Cross Platform TypeScript Editor

 
2012 software
Cross-platform software
JavaScript programming language family
Microsoft free software
Microsoft programming languages
Object-based programming languages
Programming languages created in 2012
Scripting languages
Software using the Apache license
Source-to-source compilers
Statically typed programming languages

tk:TypeScript